Sanders may refer to:

People

Surname
 Sanders (surname)

Given name
Sanders Anne Laubenthal (1943–2002), US writer
Sanders Shiver (born 1955), former US National Football League player

Corporations
 Sanders Associates, part of BAE Systems
 Sanders Aviation
 Sanders Coaches, bus operator in England
 Sanders Confectionery, Detroit, United States

Place names
United States
 Sanders, Arizona, an unincorporated community
 Sanders, Indiana, an unincorporated community
 Sanders, Kentucky, a city
 Sanders Township, Pennington County, Minnesota
 Sanders, Montana, an unincorporated community
 Sanders County, Montana
 Sanders Creek, Texas
 Fort Sanders (Wyoming), constructed in 1866 near Laramie
Astronomy
 3029 Sanders, an asteroid

Other uses
 Sanders of Oxford, an antique print shop in England
 Sanders Theater, a lecture and concert hall at Harvard University
 Sanders, a variation of Sawney, an obsolete nickname for a Scot
 Sanders of the River, a fictional character created by Edgar Wallace
 Greg Sanders, character on US TV series CSI: Crime Scene Investigation
 , the name of two US Navy ships
 Sanders, a fictional character from The Ridonculous Race
 Sanders portrait of William Shakespeare, painted 1603

See also
 Sander (disambiguation)
 Sandars (disambiguation)
 Sanders House (disambiguation), various US buildings
 Justice Sanders (disambiguation)